The Washington–Washington State men's basketball rivalry is a college basketball rivalry between the University of Washington and Washington State University men's basketball teams, the Washington Huskies and Washington State Cougars. The series began in the 1909–10 season and has been played annually since the 1916–17 season. The teams have met 292 times, with Washington leading the series 186–108 as of 2022.

Bud Withers of The Seattle Times has questioned whether the in-state series can be legitimately called a "rivalry", since Washington and Washington State have never made the NCAA Tournament in the same season. However, despite lacking sustained success on the court, both schools count the other as their principal rival. WSU's head coach, Kyle Smith, stated: “I don’t put [[other series]] in the same category -- no offense to Idaho. UW and Pac-12: that’s the real rivalry. Sorry Moscow, but that can’t be considered our rivalry. There’s nothing to gain on that one, let’s put it that way.”

Game results
Rankings are from the AP Poll. One Washington victory is missing from the table.

References

College basketball rivalries in the United States
Washington Huskies men's basketball
Washington State Cougars men's basketball